The pinyon mouse (Peromyscus truei) is native to the southwestern United States and Baja California in Mexico.  These medium-sized mice are often distinguished by their relatively large ears.  The range of this species extends from southern Oregon and Wyoming in the north, and extends south to roughly the U.S.-Mexico border, with a disjunct population known as the Palo Duro mouse (Peromyscus truei comanche) that occupies an area in the vicinity of Palo Duro Canyon in the Texas panhandle.

Description
The fur of pinyon mice varies in color from a pale yellowish brown to a brownish black color, and their feet are a lighter color, varying between dusky and white. They are similar in appearance to the white-footed mouse (P. leucopus), but there are a few distinguishing differences. P. truei tends to have larger ears, as large or larger than the hind foot. They also have a larger tail with a more heavily-furred tip. The skull of P. truei is larger than that of P. leucopus, with more inflated auditory bullae and a less robust zygomatic arch than the latter species.

Distribution and habitat
P. truei can be found in a variety of habitats. Although they prefer rocky slopes and pinyon-juniper woodland, they are also found in desert, forest, and grassy plains. They are flexible in habitat and elevation and are able to adjust to varying climate conditions.

Diet
P. truei are omnivores and have been found with insects, invertebrates and fungi, but they tend to be more specialists, compared to other Peromyscus when searching for food. In burned out areas they tend to stick to the edges instead of moving into the burn area. Finding water is usually a challenge in most of their habitats and they adjust their diet accordingly.

References

Peromyscus
Mammals described in 1885